Reginald Ellis Tongue (17 July 1912 – 1 June 1992), from Lancashire, was an English racing driver.

Career
In 1934 Reggie competed in his first major race in the 1934 24 Hours of Le Mans, aged 22.

During the 1930s he placed well in a handful of Voiturette races and won the Cork Grand Prix handicap race on 16 May 1936.

In 1951, Tongue competed at the Rallye Monte-Carlo, driving a Jaguar Mark V with his co-driver P.E. Warr. The Englishman finished the race in 31st.

Personal life
He was born into a wealthy family and his motor experience was "loaning" his father's 1924 10/23 Talbot two-seater, destroying the lawn in front of the house during the process.

References

English racing drivers
1912 births
1992 deaths